Arlington Municipal Airport may refer to:

 Arlington Municipal Airport (Oregon) in Arlington, Oregon, United States (FAA: 1S8)
 Arlington Municipal Airport (South Dakota) in Arlington, South Dakota, United States (FAA: 3A9)
 Arlington Municipal Airport (Tennessee), a former airport in Arlington, Tennessee, United States (FAA: LHC)
 Arlington Municipal Airport (Texas) in Arlington, Texas, United States (FAA: GKY)
 Arlington Municipal Airport (Washington) in Arlington, Washington, United States (FAA: AWO)